On Food And Cooking: The Science And Lore Of The Kitchen is a book by Harold McGee, published by Scribner in the United States in 1984 and revised extensively for a 2004 second edition. It is published by Hodder & Stoughton in Britain under the title McGee on Food and Cooking: An Encyclopedia of Kitchen Science, History and Culture.

The book provides a reference to the scientific understanding and preparation of food. It has been described by Alton Brown as "the Rosetta stone of the culinary world", Daniel Boulud has called the book a "must for every cook who possesses an inquiring mind", while Heston Blumenthal has stated it is "the book that has had the greatest single impact on my cooking".

The work is separated into sections that focus on the ingredients, providing the structure for the author to speculate on the history of foodstuffs and cookery, and the molecular characteristics of food flavors, while the text is illustrated by charts, graphs, pictures, and sidebar boxes with quotes from sources such as Brillat-Savarin and Plutarch. The book advises on how to cook many things (e.g., for pasta use abundant water, with reasons and the science behind everything) and includes a few historical recipes (e.g., Fish or Meat Jelly, by Taillevent in 1375), but no modern recipes as such.

See also 
Food science

References

External links 
On Food and Cooking on McGee's site "Curious Cook"

1984 non-fiction books
Cookbooks
Specialized encyclopedias